Oppe Pinto (born 30 April 1963) is a Paraguayan boxer. He competed in the men's flyweight event at the 1984 Summer Olympics.

References

1963 births
Living people
Flyweight boxers
Paraguayan male boxers
Olympic boxers of Paraguay
Boxers at the 1984 Summer Olympics
Pan American Games competitors for Paraguay
Boxers at the 1983 Pan American Games
Place of birth missing (living people)